Pipe Creek Falls Resort is a national historic district located at Tipton Township, Cass County, Indiana. The district encompasses five contributing buildings, one contributing site, and two contributing structures associated with a recreational site and campground on a wooded site overlooking Pipe Creek.  It developed between about 1888 and 1940 and includes notable examples of Bungalow / American Craftsman style architecture.  Notable contributing resources include the Pipe Creek Grist Mill (1914), generator shed (1914), bath house (1914), storage shed (1940), restroom (1940), concession stand (1940), the foundation of a carousel, and rock shelters.

It was listed on the National Register of Historic Places in 1995.

References

Historic districts on the National Register of Historic Places in Indiana
Industrial buildings completed in 1914
Historic districts in Cass County, Indiana
National Register of Historic Places in Cass County, Indiana